The 2022 United Arab Emirates Tri-Nation Series was the 9th round of the 2019–2023 ICC Cricket World Cup League 2 cricket tournament that took place in the United Arab Emirates in March 2022. Originally scheduled to take place in December 2021, it was moved to March 2022 due to fixtures impacted by the COVID-19 pandemic being rearranged.

The tri-nation series was contested between Namibia, Oman and the United Arab Emirates cricket teams, with the matches played as One Day International (ODI) fixtures. The ICC Cricket World Cup League 2 formed part of the qualification pathway to the 2023 Cricket World Cup. The series also includes an additional ODI match, between Namibia and Oman. The match was originally scheduled to be played in round four in January 2020, but was cancelled following the death of Qaboos bin Said.

Squads

Fixtures

1st ODI

2nd ODI

3rd ODI

4th ODI

5th ODI

6th ODI

7th ODI

Notes

References

External links
 Series home at ESPN Cricinfo

2022 in Emirati cricket
2022 in Namibian cricket
2022 in Omani cricket
International cricket competitions in 2021–22
United Arab Emirates
March 2022 sports events in the United Arab Emirates